Jeff Reynolds (born January 25, 1966) is an American former professional sprinter. He won a bronze medal in the 400m at the 1991 Pan American Games, and a silver medal from running in the preliminary round of the 4x400m relay at the 1991 World Championships in Athletics.

He is the younger brother of Butch Reynolds, who once held the world record in the 400m. Butch teased his brother's racing, at one meet saying that Jeff "got out of the blocks as slow as a turtle."

Major international competitions

References 

Living people
1966 births
American male sprinters
Pan American Games bronze medalists for the United States
Athletes (track and field) at the 1991 Pan American Games
Pan American Games medalists in athletics (track and field)
Medalists at the 1991 Pan American Games